Otiorhynchus armadillo is a species of broad-nosed weevil belonging to the family Curculionidae, subfamily Entiminae.

It is mainly present in Austria, France, Germany, Italy, Great Britain, Romania, Slovenia and Switzerland.

Otiorhynchus armadillo is polyphagous and it is considered a serious pest of horticultural and ornamental plants. The soil-living larvae feed on the roots of many host plants, while the adults feed on leaves.

They are black, with longitudinal grooves on the surface of the elytra.

Subspecies 
Otiorhynchus armadillo armadillo (Rossi, 1792)
Otiorhynchus armadillo obsitus Gyllenhal, 1834

References

External links 
 Biolib
 Fauna Europaea
 

Entiminae
Beetles of Europe
Beetles described in 1792
Taxa named by Pietro Rossi